Express 4 is a high speed catamaran built by Austal for Molslinjen.

History
Molslinjen ordered Express 4 in June 2016, at a cost of about A$100 million.  In April 2017, construction began at Austal's Henderson shipyard with the ceremonial first aluminum cutting. In August 2018, the ship was launched, with fitting out and sea trials scheduled to be completed by the end of the year ahead of entry into service in early 2019.

Express 4 left the construction hall on 27 August 2018 and was launched in October. Since being delivered, she has operated between Aarhus and Odden, Denmark.

Design
She can carry up to 1,006 passengers and 22 crew, and has two vehicle decks with space for 425 cars and an additional 610 lane meters for freight vehicles.

References

External links

Express 4 Perth to AARHUS

Ships built by Austal
2018 ships